Festim Miraka (born 31 December 1987) is an Albanian professional footballer who plays as a goalkeeper for KF Burreli.

Club career

Luftëtari Gjirokastër
On 12 October 2017, in the last moments of 2017–18 Albanian Superliga match against Kazma, Miraka conceded a penalty by punching Stevan Račić in the stomach. He was immediately sent off by the referee as Luftëtari conceded and eventually lost the match 1–2 at home. One day later, he was suspended 5 matches by Disciplinary Committee of Albanian Football Association for unsportsmanlike conduct. Miraka justified his action by saying that the striker insulted him. He was also suspended by club immediately after for an unlimited time until a second notice. On 10 November, Miraka terminated his contract with the club and become a free agent in the process, stating: "The suspension without end is not acceptable."

References

External links
 Profile - FSHF

1987 births
Living people
People from Gramsh, Elbasan
Association football goalkeepers
Albanian footballers
KS Turbina Cërrik players
Luftëtari Gjirokastër players
KS Lushnja players
KF Luz i Vogël 2008 players
KF Tërbuni Pukë players
KS Pogradeci players
Besa Kavajë players
KF Bylis Ballsh players
Kategoria e Parë players
Kategoria Superiore players